Chersotis juncta, known generally as the stirrup dart moth or spear dart moth, is a species of cutworm or dart moth in the family Noctuidae. It is found in Europe and Northern Asia (excluding China) and North America.

The MONA or Hodges number for Chersotis juncta is 11003.

References

Further reading

 
 
 

Noctuinae
Articles created by Qbugbot
Moths described in 1878